Josep Trueta i Raspall (27 October 1897 – 19 January 1977) was a Catalan surgeon and researcher from Spain.

Biography
As a Catalan nationalist, he fled into exile to England after the Spanish Civil War, during which he had been the chief of trauma services for the main hospital in Barcelona. In 1939 a booklet of his, first published in Catalan, was published in English as Treatment of War Wounds and Fractures, with special reference to the Closed Method as used in the war in Spain, in London. His work was noted and accepted by the British RAMC, thus influencing British Army medical practice. During World War II, he helped to organize medical emergency services. His use of a new plaster cast method for the treatment of open wounds and fractures helped save a great number of lives and still more limbs, during several wars.

Trueta formed part of a group of Catalans exiled in the United Kingdom who denounced the situation of Catalonia in Francoist Spain. He wrote The Spirit of Catalonia, a book aimed at explaining Catalan history to English-speaking society.

He joined the team run by Florey and Chain that developed penicillin in Oxford, and held the first live animal to be injected with the groundbreaking antibiotic.

From 1949 to 1966 he was the third Nuffield Professor of Orthopaedic Surgery at the University of Oxford and directed the Nuffield Orthopaedic Centre (previously the Wingfield-Morris Hospital).

On his retirement in 1966, he returned to Catalonia with his wife Amèlia. Both were buried (in 1977 and 1975 respectively) in Santa Cristina d'Aro.

The main hospital of Girona, Josep Trueta University Hospital, was named after him, as are streets in many towns across Catalonia. Every year the government of Catalonia awards Trueta medals and plaques to professionals and institutions that excel in the Catalan medical field.

References

External links
The Spirit of Catalonia. Josep Trueta. 1946 - Digital edition 
JosepTrueta.com 
Personal papers and books of Josep Trueta are kept in the Biblioteca de Catalunya

1897 births
1977 deaths
Scientists from Catalonia
Physicians from Catalonia
Members of the Institute for Catalan Studies
Statutory Professors of the University of Oxford
Spanish exiles
Spanish expatriates in the United Kingdom